In physiology, a joint is a connection between bones.

In UK English, it is also used for a large piece of meat, usually containing a bone.

Joint may also refer to:

Construction and engineering 
 Joint encoding, combining several channels of similar information during encoding to obtain higher quality or smaller file size
 Joint (building), a junction of building elements with no transfer of a static load
 Joint (mechanics), a connection between two bodies which allows movement
 Discontinuity (geotechnical engineering) or joint, a transition plane between two types of materials

Music 
 "Joint" (song), a 2007 song by Mami Kawada
 "Joints", a song by Holly Miranda from The Magician's Private Library
 "John" or "Joint", a 2002 song by Upsurt

Other uses 
 Joint (cannabis), a cannabis cigarette
 Joint (geology), a fracture in a rock mass
 American Jewish Joint Distribution Committee or the Joint
 Prison or the joint
 Juke joint, an informal establishment featuring music, dancing, gambling, and drinking
 Joint, a TV movie by Yaky Yosha
 "A Spike Lee Joint", a movie production of Spike Lee

People with the name
 Alf Joint (1927–2005), British stuntman

See also
 Bolted joint, the use of screw-thread fasteners to connect parts
 Join (disambiguation)
 Joiner (disambiguation)
 Joinery (disambiguation)
 The Joint (disambiguation)
 "Joint Joint", a song by Dub Narcotic Sound System
 Mortar joint, the filled space between masonry bricks
 Plastic joining
 Universal joint, a bendable coupling between two rods
 Woodworking joint, a method to connect timber or lumber parts